Nguyễn Phúc Bảo Ân (born November 3, 1952, in Đà Lạt, Vietnam) is an illegitimate son of Bảo Đại, the last emperor of Vietnam, and concubine Lê Thị Phi Ánh.

Bao An attended Quang Trung Military Academy in Dalat. He immigrated to the United States in 1992. He lives in Westminster, California.

In 1984, his mother died in Vietnam. 

In 1997, his father died in Paris, France. 

In 2012, his sister Nguyễn Phúc Phương Minh died in Westminster, California.   

Bao An is acknowledged in the book "Empire of Vietnam" (Đế Quốc Việt Nam) by Professor Phạm Cao Dương.

Ancestry

References

1952 births
Living people
Nguyen dynasty princes
Pretenders to the Vietnamese throne
Vietnamese princes